You, Baby is an album by jazz cornetist Nat Adderley released on the CTI label featuring performances by Adderley with Jerome Richardson, Joe Zawinul, Ron Carter, and Grady Tate and an orchestra arranged and conducted by Bill Fischer.

Reception
The Allmusic review by Richard S. Ginell awarded the album 4½ stars calling it "A lovely, intensely musical album, well worth seeking out".

Track listing
All compositions by Nat Adderley except as indicated
 "You Baby" (Ivy Hunter, Jack Goga, Jeffrey Bowen) - 2:46
 "By the Time I Get to Phoenix" (Jim Webb) - 3:20
 "Electric Eel" - 4:58
 "Early Chanson" [aka "Joe's Blues #1"] (Joe Zawinul) - 2:25
 "Denise" (Wilson J. Turbinton, Earl J. Turbinton) - 3:59
 "Early Minor" [aka "Joe's Untitled #2"] (Zawinul) - 3:45
 "My Son" (Caiphus Semenya) - 4:28
 "New Orleans" - 4:20
 "Hang On In" (Eric Knight) - 3:31
 "Halftime" (Nat Adderley, Julian "Cannonball" Adderley) - 2:39
Recorded at Englewood Cliffs, New Jersey on March 26, 1968 (tracks 4 & 7), March 27, 1968 (tracks 3, 6 & 9), March 28, 1968 (tracks 2, 5, 8 & 10) and April 4, 1968 (track 1)

Personnel 
 Nat Adderley – cornet
 Jerome Richardson - soprano saxophone, flute
 Harvey Estrin, Romeo Penque, Joe Soldo - flute
 George Marge - flute, oboe
 Joe Zawinul  - electric piano
 Ron Carter - bass
 Grady Tate - drums
 Al Brown, Selwart Clarke, Bernard Zaslav - viola
 Charles McCracken, George Ricci, Alan Shulman - cello
 Bill Fischer - arranger, conductor

Production
 Pete Turner - photography

References 

1969 albums
CTI Records albums
Nat Adderley albums
Albums produced by Creed Taylor
Albums recorded at Van Gelder Studio